In medicine, heroic treatment or course of therapy is one which possesses a high risk of causing further damage to a patient's health, but is undertaken as a last resort with the understanding that any lesser treatment will surely result in failure.

Heroic measures are often taken in cases of grave injury or illness, as a last-ditch attempt to save life, limb, or eyesight. Examples include emergency trauma surgery conducted outside the operating room (such as "on-scene" surgical amputation, cricothyroidotomy, or thoracotomy), or administration of medication (such as certain antibiotics and chemotherapy drugs) at dosage levels high enough to potentially cause serious or fatal side effects.

Cardiopulmonary resuscitation is a particularly well-known heroic measure; vigorous chest compressions often result in fracturing one or more of the patient's ribs, but since the alternative is certain death, the technique is accepted as necessary.

Patients with advanced AIDS and concomitant pneumocystis pneumonia (PCP) are in serious danger of acute respiratory distress syndrome (ARDS). A heroic rescue could use the chemotherapeutic drug trimetrexate, which would destroy bone marrow as well as the PCP, although leucovorin can protect the marrow.

See also
Heroic medicine
Drug of last resort
Salvage therapy

References

Emergency medicine
Intensive care medicine
Medical treatments
Medical emergencies